The Central District of Sareyn County is in Ardabil province, Iran. At the 2006 census, its population was 17,197 in 3,937 households. The following census in 2011 counted 13,062 people in 3,710 households. At the latest census in 2016, the district had 13,305 inhabitants living in 3,879 households.

References 

Sareyn County

Districts of Ardabil Province

Populated places in Ardabil Province

Populated places in Sareyn County